Mondovi is a city  along the Buffalo River in Buffalo County, Wisconsin, United States. The population was 2,777 at the 2010 census. The city is located mostly within the Town of Mondovi. A small portion lies within the Town of Naples.

History
A post office called Mondovi has been in operation since 1854. Mondovi was laid out in 1855. The city was named in commemoration of the Battle of Mondovì.

Geography
Mondovi is located at  (44.568865, -91.669634).

Climate

Demographics

2010 census
As of the census of 2010, there were 2,777 people, 1,194 households, and 722 families living in the city. The racial makeup of the city was 96.7% White, 0.6% African American, 0.6% Native American, 0.5% Asian, 0.2% from other races, and 1.4% from two or more races. Hispanic or Latino of any race were 1.4% of the population.

There were 1,194 households, of which 32.1% had children under the age of 18 living with them, 42.6% were married couples living together, 13.8% had a female householder with no husband present, 4.0% had a male householder with no wife present, and 39.5% were non-families. 33.7% of all households were made up of individuals, and 17.7% had someone living alone who was 65 years of age or older. The average household size was 2.26 and the average family size was 2.89.

The median age in the city was 39.9 years. 24.2% of residents were under the age of 18; 8.4% were between the ages of 18 and 24; 23.5% were from 25 to 44; 23.8% were from 45 to 64; and 20% were 65 years of age or older. The gender makeup of the city was 46.3% male and 53.7% female.

2000 census
As of the census of 2000, there were 2,634 people, 1,122 households, and 657 families living in the city. The population density was 695.2 people per square mile (268.3/km2). There were 1,232 housing units at an average density of 325.2 per square mile (125.5/km2). The racial makeup of the city was 98.71% White, 0.19% Black or African American, 0.30% Native American, 0.27% Asian, and 0.53% from two or more races. 0.46% of the population were Hispanic or Latino of any race.

There were 1,122 households, out of which 27.0% had children under the age of 18 living with them, 45.5% were married couples living together, 9.5% had a female householder with no husband present, and 41.4% were non-families. 36.7% of all households were made up of individuals, and 21.5% had someone living alone who was 65 years of age or older. The average household size was 2.26 and the average family size was 2.96.

In the city, the population was spread out, with 23.5% under the age of 18, 8.0% from 18 to 24, 24.8% from 25 to 44, 20.2% from 45 to 64, and 23.4% who were 65 years of age or older. The median age was 40 years. For every 100 females, there were 85.5 males. For every 100 females age 18 and over, there were 80.5 males.

The median income for a household in the city was $31,000, and the median income for a family was $40,954. Males had a median income of $30,947 versus $21,434 for females. The per capita income for the city was $17,023. About 8.8% of families and 11.2% of the population were below the poverty line, including 14.4% of those under age 18 and 10.3% of those age 65 or over.

Government

Elected City Officials 
 Mayor, Brady L. Weiss

 City Council Members (7)
 Ginny Gunderson - At Large
 Angie Risen - Ward 1
 Gary Stanton - Ward 1
 Duey Bauer - Ward 2
 David Schultz - Ward 2
 Nathan Nelson- Ward 3
 Greg Bauer - Ward 3

Appointed City Officials 
 City Administrator/Clerk Bradley J. Hanson
 Police Chief Colin Severson
 Fire Chief Steve Anderson
 Director of Public Works Randall K. Gruber
 Street Superintendent James J. Rud
 Treasurer Dawn Moy
 Utility Clerk/Administrative Receptionist Jackie Dregney
 Administrative Assistant Sharon Nault

Police Department 
The Mondovi Police Department is a full time department offering 24/7 police service to the City of Mondovi. The department consists of four full-time sworn officers, and four part-time sworn officers. The Mondovi Police Department has an officer dedicated as a working K9 handler. The officer works with K9 Buck, a pure bred German Shepherd, who is certified in narcotics detection and tracking. The department also owns an All Terrain Vehicle, which it uses to patrol the city parks and the Buffalo River State Trail, which enters the city from the east.

Fire Department 
The Mondovi Fire Department consists of 30 volunteers.

Public Works 
The Public Works Department consists of 6 full-time employees.

Emergency Medical Service 
The Mondovi Ambulance Service is a private service that operates in the City of Mondovi and surrounding areas. The staff consists of a number of volunteers. Mondovi EMS has two fully equipped ambulances.

City Council Meetings 
 City Council Meetings held the 2nd and 4th Tuesdays of each month January through October.
 Meetings are held on the 2nd Tuesday only in November and December.
 All regularly scheduled City Council meetings begin at 6:30 p.m.
 Meeting notices and agendas are posted at Mondovi City Hall, Mondovi Post Office, Mondovi Police Department, Mondovi Public Library, Mondovi Herald-News Offices and are published in the Mondovi Herald-News weekly publication the Thursday before the meeting when possible.
 Any updates to posted agendas can be made until 1:00 p.m. the day before the meeting.  
 The Finance Committee meets on the Monday before the 2nd Tuesday of the month at 6:30 p.m.

Education

School District of Mondovi 
The School District of Mondovi includes three schools. The Elementary School includes children in pre-school through Grade 5, the Middle School encompasses students in Grades 6 to 8, and the High School includes students in Grades 9-12. During the 2013-2014 school year, total enrollment was 966. The student-to-teacher ratio in pre-kindergarten through Grade 3 is no more than 18:1; the ratio in all other grades is less than 25:1. There are 78 certified staff, 3 administrators, and 46 full- or part-time support staff members. 

District facilities include a complex in the city of Mondovi and another building, Anthony School, located about eight miles north of Mondovi on Highway 37. Students in Five-Year-Old Kindergarten through Grade 12 attend the city school; students participating in the Early Childhood program or the Four-Year-Old Kindergarten program attend Anthony School. The city complex includes an outdoor swimming pool, a distance learning center, a fine arts performance area, weight room, three indoor athletic areas, and an outdoor physical education area which includes newly-renovated tennis courts and running track, a football field, baseball and softball fields, and additional practice fields.

Parks and Trails

Buffalo River State Trail 
The Buffalo River State Trail passes through Mondovi offering a safe and scenic place for snowmobiling, horseback riding, ATV riding, hiking and biking.  The 36.4 mile multi-use trail runs from Mondovi to Fairchild, Wisconsin and passes farms, woods, hills, marshland and the Buffalo River. Several other multi-purpose recreational trails are located near Mondovi including the Red Cedar State Trail, Chippewa River State Trail and Great River State Trail

Joseph Peterson Arboretum 
Joseph Peterson Arboretum is a 10-acre natural area.  Nearby public park area includes two volleyball courts, playground equipment and a picnic shelter. 

Other Facilities:
 Community Center
 4 baseball/softball fields
 6 tennis courts
 Public outdoor swimming pool

Mirror Lake Park 
Mirror Lake Park has a scenic view of Mondovi's Mirror Lake, playground equipment, picnic areas, and shelters. A public boat landing is located at the park and an accessible fishing pier accommodates anglers and sightseers of all abilities.

Sharps Point Park 
Sharps Point Park is the site of the Mondovi Veteran's Memorial and is located along the banks of Mirror Lake.

Tourist Park 
Six campsites are available on a first-come, first-served basis. The campsites offer electrical hook-ups, water, and a sanitary dump that is available at the City’s wastewater treatment plant on weekdays from 8am-3pm. Two shelters can be reserved for special events, one of which is a historic log cabin. Tourist Park also has a museum on site that is open to the public.

Notable people

 Grover L. Broadfoot, chief justice of the Wisconsin Supreme Court and mayor of Mondovi
 Menzus R. Bump, Wisconsin State Representative
 Chauncey H. Cooke (1846–1919), American soldier in the U.S. Civil War
 Dorothy Geeben, Florida politician
 Diane Hendricks, American businesswoman
 Robert I. Johnson, Wisconsin State Representative
 Tim Krumrie, former Cincinnati Bengals noseguard, attended high school in Mondovi.
 Ole H. Olson, Governor of North Dakota
 Jacki Rickert, activist
 Frank Schaettle, Wisconsin State Representative
 Lester Schnare, U.S. diplomat
 Dutee A. Whelan, Wisconsin State Representative

 Treig Pronschinske, Mayor and Wisconsin State Representative

See also
 List of cities in Wisconsin

References

External links

 
 School District of Mondovi
 Sanborn fire insurance maps: 1894 1903 1909

Cities in Wisconsin
Cities in Buffalo County, Wisconsin